In Another World is the twentieth studio album by American rock band Cheap Trick, released on April 9, 2021.

Background
The album's first single, "The Summer Looks Good on You", was released on May 18, 2018. Though no official release date was announced, the album was initially due for release at the end of 2018 but was ultimately not released that year. The second single, a cover of John Lennon's "Gimme Some Truth", was released on November 29, 2019. The album was completed by 2020 but its release was further delayed due to the COVID-19 pandemic.

On January 28, 2021, a third single, "Light Up the Fire", was released alongside an announcement of the album's title, tracklist, and the April 9 release date. Later, on March 11, 2021, a fourth single called "Boys & Girls & Rock N Roll" was released. Later, the song was played live on The Late Show with Stephen Colbert on the album's release date.

Track listing

Personnel
Personnel as listed in the album's liner notes are:

Cheap Trick
 Robin Zander – lead vocals, guitar
 Rick Nielsen – guitar
 Tom Petersson – bass
 Daxx Nielsen – drums

Additional musicians
 Tim Lauer, Bennett Salvay – keyboards
 Jimmy Hall – harmonica
 Steve Jones – additional guitar (track 13)
 Robin Taylor Zander – additional guitars, vocals

Production
 Julian Raymond, Cheap Trick – producers
 Chris Lord-Alge – mixing
 Howard Willing, Julian King, Mark Dobson, Bryan Cook, Jim "Pinky" Beeman – engineers
 Lars Fox – Pro Tools engineer
 Ted Jensen – mastering

Other
 Cheap Trick, Dale Voelker – art direction, design
 Jeff Daly, Lou Brutus – photography

Charts

References

2021 albums
Cheap Trick albums
BMG Rights Management albums
Albums produced by Julian Raymond
Albums postponed due to the COVID-19 pandemic